The British High Commission in Ottawa, Ontario, is the main diplomatic mission of the United Kingdom in Canada. It is located at 80 Elgin Street in downtown Ottawa, across the street from the National Arts Centre and not far from Parliament Hill.

History 
The current building was opened in 1964 and designed by Eric Bedford. Previously the site had been home to the Union Hotel, founded in the 1850s but demolished in 1962.

The High Commissioner's position was created in 1928 after the Balfour Declaration of 1926 and was the first such posting for Britain. The present High Commissioner is Susannah Goshko. The UK has Consulates-General in Toronto, Montreal, Calgary, and Vancouver.  It has Honorary Consuls in St. John's, Halifax, Quebec City, and Winnipeg. The High Commission also represents the British Overseas Territories in Canada.

The High Commissioner resides at Earnscliffe, a mansion on the Ottawa River.

In 2019, the UK Government announced a new building would be constructed for the High Commission, on property next to Earnscliffe. The new building is scheduled to open in July 2022.

See also
 Canada–United Kingdom relations
 Diplomatic missions in Canada
 List of High Commissioners of the United Kingdom to Canada

External links
UK and Canada

References

Canada and the Commonwealth of Nations
Canada–United Kingdom relations
United Kingdom
Ottawa